is a song recorded by Japanese boy band Arashi. It was released on March 7, 2012 by their record label J Storm. "Wild at Heart" is the theme song for the drama Lucky Seven starring Arashi member Jun Matsumoto. The song has been described as an "energetic rock" song complementing the drama. The single debuted at number-one on the Oricon daily and weekly charts. It is the group's 26th consecutive number one single.

Track listing

References

2012 singles
2012 songs
Arashi songs
Japanese television drama theme songs
Oricon Weekly number-one singles
Billboard Japan Hot 100 number-one singles